Mykola Shchors (1895–1919) was a Ukrainian communist and military leader. 

Shchors may also refer to:

 Shchors (film), a 1939 film about Nikolay Shchors
Shchors (opera), a 1937 opera by Borys Lyatoshynsky
 Snovsk, a city in Ukraine known as Shchors 1935–2016